Elections were held in Illinois on Tuesday, November 5, 2002. Primary elections were held on March 19, 2002.

The Democratic Party made gains in these elections, while the Republican Party conversely saw losses. The Democratic Party retained their control of the State House and flipped control of the State Senate. The Democratic Party also won the Governorship and Lieutenant Governorship in their combined election, ending 26 years of Republican control of the state's executive branch. In addition, among the other four statewide elected offices, the Democratic Party retained their hold of two (Secretary of State and Comptroller), while flipping another (Attorney General). This left Illinois Treasurer Judy Baar Topinka as the sole remaining Republican holder of a statewide office.

The losses for Republicans continued a decline of fortunes that had taken place in the state of Illinois over the last several elections for the party, which previously had held all statewide elected offices and both chambers of the Illinois General Assembly in the mid-1990s (following the 1994 elections).

Election information
2002 was a midterm election year in the United States.

Turnout

Primary election
For the primary election, turnout was 32.84%, with 2,321,875 votes cast. 

Turnout by county

General election
For the general election, turnout was 51.86%, with 3,653,060 votes cast.

Turnout by county

Federal elections

United States Senate 

Incumbent Democratic United States Senator Dick Durbin won reelection to a second term.

United States House 

Illinois had lost one seat in the reapportionment following the 2000 United States Census. All 19 of Illinois' remaining seats in the United States House of Representatives were up for election in 2002.

Before the election, Democrats and Republicans each held 10 seats from Illinois. In 2002, Republicans won 10 seats while Democrats won 9.

State elections

Governor and Lieutenant Governor

Incumbent Governor George Ryan, a Republican plagued by scandals, did not seek reelection. Democrat Rod Blagojevich was elected to succeed him.

Attorney General 

Incumbent Attorney General Jim Ryan, a Republican, did not seek a third term, instead opting to run for Governor. Democrat Lisa Madigan was elected to succeed him.

Democratic primary

Republican primary

General election

Polling

Results

Secretary of State 

Incumbent Secretary of State Jesse White, a Democrat, won reelection to a second term in office.

Democratic primary

Republican primary

General election
White carried all of Illinois' 102 counties.

Comptroller 

Incumbent Comptroller Daniel Hynes, a Democrat, was reelected to a second term.

Democratic primary

Republican primary

General election

Treasurer 

Incumbent Treasurer Judy Baar Topinka, a Republican, was reelected to a third term.

Democratic primary

Republican primary

General election

State Senate

All 59 of the seats of the Illinois Senate were up for election in 2002, as this election followed a redistricting. Control of the Illinois Senate was flipped from Republican to Democratic. Republicans had been in control of the State Senate since 1993, having captured a majority from the 1992 election.

State House of Representatives

All of the seats in the Illinois House of Representatives were up for election in 2002. Democrats retained control of the Illinois House of Representatives, which they had held since 1997, having won a majority in the 1996 election.

Judicial elections
Multiple judicial positions were up for election in 2002.

Local elections
Local elections were held. These included county elections, such as the Cook County elections.

Notes

References

 
Illinois